St. Mark's Historic District is a historic district located in the East Village neighborhood of Manhattan, New York City. The district was designated a city landmark by the New York City Landmarks Preservation Commission in 1969, and it was extended in 1984 to include two more buildings on East 10th Street. It was listed on the National Register of Historic Places in 1974 and was expanded in 1985. The boundaries of the NRHP district and its expansion are now coterminous with those of the LPC.

St. Mark's Church in-the-Bowery is the centerpiece of the district, but it extends beyond the church and its rectory to include much of Stuyvesant Street and some of East 10th Street, which contain a small collection of Italianate and Federal-style houses and residential buildings.

Gallery

References
Notes

External links

Houses on the National Register of Historic Places in Manhattan
East Village, Manhattan
Historic districts on the National Register of Historic Places in Manhattan
New York City Designated Landmarks in Manhattan
New York City designated historic districts